Erik Watndal (born 27 August 1979) is a sport shooter who represented Norway at the 2004 Summer Olympics, where he participated in the men's skeet event and finished tied for eighth position.

References

External links
 
 
 
 

1979 births
Living people
Norwegian male sport shooters
Skeet shooters
Olympic shooters of Norway
Shooters at the 2004 Summer Olympics
Sportspeople from Oslo
European Games competitors for Norway
Shooters at the 2019 European Games
Shooters at the 2020 Summer Olympics
21st-century Norwegian people